Al-Majawi  is a Syrian village located in Ayn Halaqim Nahiyah in Masyaf District, Hama.  According to the Syria Central Bureau of Statistics (CBS), al-Majawi had a population of 1,517 in the 2004 census.

References 

Populated places in Masyaf District